Ann Geraldine Mary Fleming (19 June 1913 – 12 July 1981), previously known as Lady O'Neill and Viscountess Rothermere, was a British socialite. She married firstly Lord O'Neill, secondly Lord Rothermere, and finally the writer Ian Fleming. She also had affairs with the Labour Party politicians Hugh Gaitskell and Roy Jenkins.

Life
Fleming was born to Frances Lucy Tennant (1887–1925) and Captain Guy Lawrence Charteris (1886–1967) in Westminster, London on 19 June 1913. She was the eldest daughter and her grandfather was Hugo Charteris, 11th Earl of Wemyss. Her grandmother was Mary Constance Wyndham, who had her own hedonistic past, having been one of The Souls.

Her sister was Laura Spencer-Churchill, Duchess of Marlborough and her brother was the novelist Hugo Charteris.

She was educated by governesses after an unsuccessful term at Cheltenham Ladies' College. She had a good understanding of literature but her future was to be a debutante and she quickly married Shane O'Neill, 3rd Baron O'Neill who was both an aristocrat and a financier in 1932. She had two children before beginning an affair with the influential Esmond Cecil Harmsworth in 1936.

Harmsworth was the heir to Harold Harmsworth, 1st Viscount Rothermere, who owned the Daily Mail. Her husband went to war and Ann appeared with Harmsworth as well as having an affair with Ian Fleming, then a stockbroker, who became an assistant to the Director of Naval Intelligence. In 1940, Harmsworth became Lord Rothermere. Her husband was killed in action in 1944 and she married Lord Rothermere in 1945.

The couple entertained and their social circle included the painter Lucian Freud (who painted her portrait), the choreographer Frederick Ashton and the artist Francis Bacon. Meanwhile, Ian Fleming left the navy and became a journalist with The Sunday Times. He had built Goldeneye on land in Jamaica and he had demanded three-month vacations from his employer to enjoy his holiday home. The two spent three months of every year together in Jamaica. Her new husband thought she was in Jamaica to visit Noël Coward.

In 1951 she was divorced by Lord Rothermere, and the following year she married Fleming. They had one child, Caspar.  Ann was pregnant with her son when they married; he was born on 12 August 1952.  Anxiety over his forthcoming marriage is said to be the reason that Ian Fleming wrote the first James Bond novel, Casino Royale. Ann had a £100,000 divorce settlement and Fleming sought additional sources of revenue to add to his salary from The Sunday Times. The book and its sequels were immediate successes.

The Flemings bought a house in London, where they entertained. They later rebuilt Warneford Place at Sevenhampton, near Swindon, renaming it Sevenhampton Place and moving there in 1963. Her husband was not keen on the socialising, but their houses attracted Evelyn Waugh, Cyril Connolly and Peter Quennell.

Ian died in 1964 and their son Caspar died in London in October 1975 from an overdose of narcotics. Ann Fleming died at Sevenhampton Place on 12 July 1981. Both were buried alongside Ian at the church of St James in Sevenhampton.

References

1913 births
1981 deaths
People from Westminster
English socialites
O'Neill
Rothermere
Ann
Chichester family
English people of Scottish descent
Ann
Ann